Muhammad Munir (1895–1979) was the second Chief Justice of Pakistan serving from 1954 to 1960.

Background
Munir obtained his degree of master's in English Literature from Government College University Lahore, he joined Law College to earn his L.L.B.  He started his career as a lawyer  in Amritsar in 1921. He moved to Lahore in 1922.

Career
Munir was appointed assistant advocate-general of Punjab in 1937, and first president of the Income Tax Appellate Tribunal of India in 1940. He was elevated to the Bench of Judicature at Lahore in 1942. He and Justice Din Muhammad represented the All India Muslim League on the Punjab Boundary Commission in 1947. The following year he was made the chairman of the Pakistan Pay Commission. In 1949, he was made the chief justice of the Lahore High Court.

Chief Justice
In 1954, Munir was made the chief justice of the Federal Court, chief justice of Pakistan. Besides being the chief justice, he also remained the chairman of the Delimitation Commission from June 1956 to July 1958. He retired on May 2, 1960.

Munir invoked the doctrine of necessity, validating the dissolution of the first Constituent Assembly of Pakistan. The assembly was dissolved on October 24, 1954, by Governor General Ghulam Muhammad, an alumnus of Aligarh Muslim University. He has been widely criticized for validating the dissolution, although some of the Pakistani politicians had called for its dissolution.

Writings
Justice Munir also wrote a book From Jinnah to Zia, arguing that Jinnah stood for a secular state.

See also
List of Pakistanis
Chief Justice of Pakistan
Doctrine of necessity

References

1895 births
1979 deaths
Chief justices of Pakistan
Government College University, Lahore alumni
Pakistani judges
People from Amritsar
Pakistani secularists